Irena Bjelica (born 9 January 1994) is a Montenegrin football who played  in the Montenegrin League for Ekonomist Niksic, with which she has also played the Champions League.She plays central defender and can also play as a right and left back. She played for Žnk Iskra from Bosnia and Herzegovina. Now she play for ZF/NK Emina Mostar from Bosnia and Herzegovina.

References 

1994 births
Living people
Montenegrin women's footballers
Women's association football defenders
Montenegro women's international footballers
ŽFK Ekonomist players